Vármező is the Hungarian name for two places in Romania:

 Câmpu Cetăţii village, Eremitu Commune, Mureș County
 Buciumi Commune, Sălaj County

Hungarian exonyms